The Bethesda–Silver Spring Line, designated Route J1, J2, is a daily bus route operated by the Washington Metropolitan Area Transit Authority between Silver Spring station of the Red Line of the Washington Metro and Westfield Montgomery Transit Center. Route J1 operates in the weekday peak direction only while route J2 operates daily. J1 trips roughly takes 45 minutes while J2 trips take roughly 55 minutes.

Background
Routes J1 and J2 operate between Silver Spring station and Montgomery Mall connecting passengers along the East-West Highway and Old Georgetown Road corridor. Route J1 operates during weekday rush hours only in the peak direction while route J2 operates daily. During the weekday AM peak hours, routes J1 and J2 operate along Battery Lane except on holidays. Trips to Silver Spring are not affected. Shuttles are available from Medical Center Station serving National Institutes of Health & Naval Medical campuses.

Routes J1 and J2 currently operate out of Montgomery division.

J1 stops

J2 stops

History
The J2 originally operated as a streetcar line with the J4 between Silver Spring and Beltway Plaza Mall. The J2 and J4 were converted to Metrobus routes on February 4, 1973 when WMATA bought out DC Transit and other companies to form Metrobus.

1978 Service Changes
On February 19, 1978, routes J2 and J4 were shorten to Silver Spring station and replaced by routes F4 and F6. Route F4 would operate between Silver Spring and New Carrollton, and route F6 would operate between Silver Spring and Greenbelt, Maryland. Route J2 would operate between Silver Spring and Montgomery Mall while route J4 would operate between Silver Spring and Friendship Heights station.

In addition, routes J1 and J6 would be added to the line. The J1 would operate between Silver Spring station and the National Institutes of Health via Jones Bridge and Jones Mill Roads. The J6 would operate between Silver Spring station and Friendship Heights station via Leland Street and Connecticut Avenue.

1980s
On January 22, 1984, route J6 would be discontinued, and would be replaced by Ride On routes 1 and 11. On January 27, 1985 route J4 would be discontinued, and replaced by a combination of several Ride On and Metrobus routes. On the same day the J4 was eliminated, route J3 would enter service. The J3 would offer supplemental peak direction service between Montgomery Mall and Silver Spring station.

1996 Service Changes
On December 29, 1996, route J1 was extended from Medical Center station to Montgomery Mall in order to replace route J7. The line would also serve Rock Creek Park.

2001 Service Changes
Due to security concerns following the September 11 Attacks, routes 14B, J1, J2, and J3 were forced to detour near the NIH and Medical Center. Detours goes as the following:

J2, J3 and 14B - westbound
Before 6:30 a.m. and after 9:30 a.m.
Buses will follow the current routing to Rockville Pike and South Drive, turn left on South Drive and continue to Medical Center station.
Leaving the station, buses will turn right on South Drive, left on W. Cedar Lane and right on Old Georgetown Road where the current routing will be resumed.

Between 6:30 a.m. - 9:30 a.m.
Buses will follow the current routing to Rockville Pike and South Drive, turn left on South Drive, left on Rockville Pike, left on Tuckerman Lane and left on Old Georgetown Road where the current route will be resumed.

J2, J3 and 14B - eastbound
Buses to follow the current routing to Old Georgetown Road and W. Cedar Lane. Buses will turn left on W. Cedar Lane, right on Rockville Pike,
right on South Drive and continue to Medical Center station. Leaving the station, buses will continue on South Drive to Rockville Pike, turn right on Woodmont and right on Edgemore where the regular routing will be resumed.

J1 - westbound
Buses will follow the current routing to Jones Bridge Road and S. University Boulevard. Buses will continue on Jones Bridge Road, turn right on Rockville Pike and left on South Drive to the station. From the station, buses will continue on South Drive, turn left on Rockville Pike and left on Tuckerman Lane where the current routing will be resumed.

J1 - eastbound
Buses will continue on the regular route to Old Georgetown Road and W. Cedar Lane. Buses will turn left on Cedar Lane, right on Rockville Pike, and right on South Drive to Medical Center station. Buses will leave the station via South Drive, turn right on Rockville Pike and left on Jones Bridge Road where the regular route will be resumed.

2010 Proposed Changes
In 2010 during WMATA's FY2011 budget, it was proposed to eliminate route J1 section between Medical Center station and Montgomery Mall as it overlaps route J2 and J3 service. But route J1 will operate in both directions during weekday peak hours.

2010 Service Changes
On December 19, 2010, route J1 was shorten to Medical Center station with service to Montgomery Mall being replaced by routes J2 and J3. Route J1 would operate in both directions during the weekday peak-hours between Silver Spring and Medical Center only via Jones Hill Road and Jones Bridge Road.

2015 Service Changes
When the Paul S. Sarbanes Transit Center at Silver Spring station opened on September 20, 2015, routes J1, J2, and J3 were rerouted from its terminus along Wayne Avenue to the new transit center. The J1, J2, and J3 were given Bus Bay 102 on the first level when it opened.

2016 Proposed Changes
In 2016 during WMATA's FY2018 budget year, WMATA proposed to eliminate route J1 in order to reduce costs. There will be no alternative service along Jones Mill Road and Jones Bridge Road, and reduced service at Medical Center station and along East-West Highway between Jones Mill Road and Silver Spring station. Performance measures for the line goes as follows:

According to WMATA, the portion of Route J1 exclusive to Jones Mill Road and Jones Bridge Road has 3.54 boardings per revenue trip based on Automatic Passenger Counter data during the August 2016 Schedule Period (August 21-December 18), which does not meet the WMATA standard 10.7 riders per trip. Alternative service would be provided by routes J2 and J3 at Medical Center station and along East-West
Highway, route L8 at Jones Bridge Road and Connecticut Avenue, and Ride On route 33 on Jones Bridge Road between Connecticut Ave and Medical Center station.

2017 Proposed Changes
In 2017, WMATA proposed to re-extend route J1 back to Montgomery Mall in order to replace route J3 via its old routing prior to the 2010 route shortening. But route J1 would revert to operate in the weekday peak hour direction only. According to WMATA, it states the following reasons:
 Respond to customer demand. Current travel patterns on the J1 indicate strong demand in the peak direction of travel: westbound during morning rush hours and eastbound during afternoon rush hours. J1 trips in the reverse flow direction (eastbound during morning rush hours and westbound during afternoon rush hours) have low ridership.
 Extending route J1 to Montgomery Mall will provide connections to a trip generator utilizing resources from the eliminated eastbound morning and westbound afternoon trips.
 Travel times to Montgomery Mall via the J1 will provide current route J2 and J3 customers to and from Silver Spring with a faster travel option.
 Eliminating the J3 reduces service redundancy and allows the ability to adjust service levels to meet demand on Route J1.
 With the elimination of the J3, the J1 along Rockledge Drive would be adjusted in response to customer demand between Medical Center and Rockledge Drive, and service on the J2 would be adjusted in response to customer demand along East-West Highway and Bethesda station.

According to performance measures, it goes as the following:

Average weekday J1 riders that'll be affected by the proposal goes as the following according to WMATA:

At the time of the proposed changes, route J1 operated in both directions during the peak hours while route J3 operate in the peak direction only.

2018 Service Changes
On June 24, 2018, route J1 was re-extended back to Montgomery Mall via its old routing prior to the 2010 changes. The route also reverted to operate in the weekday peak hour direction only as well which was the same prior to 2010. Route J3 was discontinued and replaced by both routes J1 and J2 as of a result.

Incidents
 On June 6, 2016, a J2 bus slammed into two trees along East-West Highway near Grubb Road after hitting a pick-up truck. The driver suffered serious injuries. 12 passengers were also hurt. The bus (XDE40 7255) suffered major damage to its front.

References

J1